This is a list of Slovak European Film Award winners and nominees. This list details the performances of Slovak actors, actresses, and films that have either been submitted or nominated for, or have won, a European Film Award.

Main categories

External links
 Nominees and winners at the European Film Academy website

See also
 List of Slovak submissions for the Academy Award for Best Foreign Language Film

European Film Award winners
European Film Academy Awards
European Film Award winners